Silver Creek is a stream in Jasper and Newton counties in the U.S. state of Missouri. It is a tributary of Shoal Creek.

Silver Creek was so named on account of deposits of silver which allegedly were in the area.

See also
List of rivers of Missouri

References

Rivers of Jasper County, Missouri
Rivers of Newton County, Missouri
Rivers of Missouri